Storgrovhøe is a mountain in Lom Municipality in Innlandet county, Norway. The mountain is surrounded by several other notable mountains including Galdhøi and Juvvasshøi to the northeast; Veslpiggen, Galdhøpiggen, Keilhaus topp, and Storjuvtinden to the southeast; Storgrovtinden and Skardstinden to the south; and Loftet to the southwest.

Storgrovhøe consists of two peaks: 
It is the 31st tallest mountain in Norway (with a prominence of at least 50 meters).
It is the 35th tallest mountain in Norway (with a prominence of at least 50 meters).

See also
List of mountains of Norway by height

References

Jotunheimen
Lom, Norway
Mountains of Innlandet